Brad Cross (born 2 October 1985) is an Australian former professional rugby league footballer who played 3 matches for the Canberra Raiders in the 2007 season of National Rugby League. He scored 2 tries in his 3 matches. He main position was centre. He played with the Souths Logan Magpies in the Queensland Cup.

1985 births
Living people
Australian rugby league players
Canberra Raiders players
Rugby league centres
Rugby league players from Dubbo
Souths Logan Magpies players